Roache is a surname. Notable people with the surname include:

Addison Roache (1817–1906), Justice of the Indiana Supreme Court
Bobby Roache, American model and actor
Francis Roache (1936–2018), American police officer and politician
James Roache, British actor and son of William Roache
Linus Roache, British actor and son of William Roache
William Roache, British actor and original cast member of Coronation Street as Ken Barlow
Tim Roache, British trade union leader for the GMB Union

See also
Roach (disambiguation)
Roach (surname)

English-language surnames